Edward Ścigała (20 February 1926 – 28 January 1990) was a Polish weightlifter. He competed in the men's lightweight event at the 1952 Summer Olympics.

References

1926 births
1990 deaths
Polish male weightlifters
Olympic weightlifters of Poland
Weightlifters at the 1952 Summer Olympics
People from Piekary Śląskie